Flanders red ale or Flemish red-brown, is a style of sour ale brewed in West Flanders, Belgium. 

Flanders red ale is fermented with organisms other than Saccharomyces cerevisiae, especially Lactobacillus, which produces a sour character attributable to lactic acid. Long periods of aging are employed, a year or more, often in oak barrels, to impart a lactic acid character to the beer. Red malt is used to give the beer its colour and the matured beer is often blended with a younger batch before bottling to balance and round the character.

Flanders red ales have a strong fruit flavour similar to the aroma, but more intense. Plum, prune, raisin and raspberry are the most common flavours, followed by orange and some spiciness. The sour or acidic taste can range from moderate to strong. There is no hop bitterness, but tannins are common. Consequently, Flanders red ales are often described as the most wine-like of all beers. 

Examples
 Rodenbach Brewery: Rodenbach
 Rodenbach Brewery: Rodenbach Grand Cru
 : VanderGhinste Roodbruin
 Omer Vander Ghinste Brewery: Cuvee des Jacobins
 Brewery Verhaeghe: Duchesse de Bourgogne
 Brewery Verhaeghe: Vichtenaar

References

External links

Beer styles
Beer in Belgium
Flanders